The Avama Stylus is a Slovak light-sport aircraft, designed and produced by Avama of Poprad and introduced at AERO Friedrichshafen in 2010. The aircraft is supplied as a kit for amateur construction or as a complete ready-to-fly-aircraft.

Design and development
The aircraft was designed to comply with the US light-sport aircraft rules as a joint venture with SK Model. It features a strut-braced high-wing a two-seats-in-side-by-side configuration enclosed cockpit, fixed tricycle landing gear or conventional landing gear and a single engine in tractor configuration.

The Stylus' fuselage is made from welded steel tubing while the wing structure is aluminum. The fuselage and flying surfaces are covered in a mix of preformed plastic and doped aircraft fabric. Its  span wing employs a dual spar design with V-struts and jury struts. The standard engine is the  Rotax 912UL or the  Rotax 912ULS four-stroke powerplant.

Variants
Stylus X2
Tailwheel version
Stylus X3
Nose wheel version

Specifications (Stylus X3)

References

External links

Homebuilt aircraft
Light-sport aircraft
Single-engined tractor aircraft